List of presidents of Ferencvárosi TC sports club.

Presidents
Further information

Gallery

List

References

Sources
 tempofradi.hu, A Ferencvárosi Torna Club elnökei

Presidents